The rivière à la Catin is a tributary of the Cami River, flowing in the municipality of L'Anse-Saint-Jean and Rivière-Éternité, in the Fjord-du-Saguenay, in the administrative region of Saguenay–Lac-Saint-Jean, in the province from Quebec, to Canada. The course of the Catin river crosses the zec du Lac-Brébeuf.

The lac à Catin area is served by Chemin du Lac à la Catin which connects to the west with Chemin du Lac Travers and Chemin du Lac Desprez. The middle part of the Catin river valley is served by the Périgny road and the Lac de la Souris road, for forestry and recreational tourism activities. The lower part is served by Chemin du Lac Brébeuf. Some secondary forest roads serve this valley.

Forestry is the main economic activity in the sector; recreational tourism, second.

The surface of the Catin River is usually frozen from the beginning of December to the end of March, however the safe circulation on the ice is generally made from mid-December to mid-March.

Geography 
The main watersheds adjacent to the Catin River are:
 north side: Brébeuf Lake, Éternité Lake, Otis Lake, Éternité River, Saguenay River;
 east side: Saint-Jean River, Quarante-Quatre lake, Portage stream, Poulin lake;
 south side: lac à la Catin, épinglette Stream, Épinglette lake, Malbaie River, Bazile Lake;
 west side: Épinglette Stream (Laplet pin brook), Cami River, Desprez Lake, Charny lake, Ha! Ha! River, Huard River.

The Catin river rises at the mouth of Lac à la Catin in a deep valley. This lake is surrounded by Mont du Saumon, Mont du Colibri and Mont Pin. The mouth of this lake is located at:
  south-west of the center of the hamlet "Les Trois-Monts";
  north-west of the center of the hamlet "L’Épinglette-des-Lacs";
  north-west of "Lac Bazile";
  north of the course of the Malbaie River;
  south-east of the mouth of Brébeuf Lake;
  south-east of the confluence of the Catin river and the Cami River.

Upper course of the Cami river (segment of )

  to the northwest by collecting the outlet (coming from the northeast) from Lac Solitaire and the outlet (coming from the south) from Lac à Lionel, to brook Pin (from the southwest);
  towards the northeast crossing three zones of rapids, passing to the northwest of a mountain whose summit reaches , turning a bend of river at the end of the segment, up to the outlet (coming from the south-east) of a mountain stream draining in particular the Mont de l'Ours (altitude:);
  towards the north almost always in rapids in a deep valley and forming a hook of  towards the west, until the discharge (coming from the northeast) of a few lakes;
  westwards, to the outlet of "Lac de la Souris";

Lower course of the Cami river (segment of )

  to the west, forming a large curve to the south, crossing an area of marsh, then a long area of rapids, up to the discharge (coming from the southwest) from the "Lac des Hauteurs";
  towards the north-west crossing several zones of rapids until a stream (coming from the east) which corresponds to a zone of marsh;
  north-west to the outlet (coming from the south) of "Lac Trouvé";
  towards the north-west entirely in the area of rapids in a steep valley, to its mouth.

The Catin river flows on the south bank of the Cami River. This confluence is located at:
  south of the confluence of the Cami River (confluence with the Saint-Jean River);
  south-east of the mouth of the Brébeuf Lake (confluence with the Saint Jean River);
  south-west of the village center of Rivière-Éternité;
  south-west of the confluence of the Saint-Jean River and L'Anse-Saint-Jean (Saguenay River);
  south of a bay on Éternité Lake;
  south-east of downtown Saguenay (city).

From the confluence of the Catin river, the current:
 follows the course of the Cami River on  towards the North;
 follows the course of the Saint-Jean River (Saguenay River tributary) on  generally towards the northeast;
 follows the course of the Saguenay River on  eastward to Tadoussac where it merges with the Estuary of Saint Lawrence.

Toponymy 
The term "Catin" refers to a doll (toy) in French.

The toponym "Rivière à la Catin" was formalized on December 5, 1968, by the Commission de toponymie du Québec.

Notes and references

Appendices

Related articles 
 Le Fjord-du-Saguenay Regional County Municipality
 L'Anse-Saint-Jean, a municipality
 Rivière-Éternité, a municipality
 Zec du Lac-au-Sable, a ZEC
 Épinglette Stream
 Cami River
 Saint-Jean River
 Saguenay River
 List of rivers of Quebec

External links 

Rivers of Saguenay–Lac-Saint-Jean
Le Fjord-du-Saguenay Regional County Municipality